Chandramathi Mudaliar was a 17th-century Tamil chieftain and ruler of south Kongu Nadu (Erode region) who fought many battles against the  Madurai Nayak

Erode Fort was built by Chandramathi Mudaliar and his family. Later it was destroyed by the British.

Chandramathi Mudaliyar was in the genealogy of Senguntha therinja Kaikolar Padai.

References

Tamil people
Madurai Nayak dynasty
People from Erode district
People from Tamil Nadu